Mehta Suja railway station is located in Mehta Suja village, Sheikhupura district of Punjab province of Pakistan.

Mehta Suja

Mehta Suja is an old village and according to legends its roots date back to the Mughal era. According to the 2017 census, the village is home to around 4000 people. The village has a diversified population and strong caste system in place. Common castes in the village include Jatt, Jolaha, Kumhar, Mistri, Changar, Faqeer, Merasi, Qasab, Mochi, and Fishermen. The Jatt sub caste of residents is called 'Sivia Jatt (Jutt) and are famously called as suja jatt (Jutt). The village is located near the Indo-Pakistan border. Notable people include Ch. Muhammad Safdar, Ch Muhammad Anwar Sivia (former-chairman), Ch Muhammad Zaheer Ahmad Sivia (Ex-Naib-Nazim), Ch Musharraf Sivia, Ch. Alem Din, Ch. Raza, Lala Muhammad Ashraf (Ex-Member) Maj. Gen. R. Hamid Nawaz Khan, Col. Haq Nawaz, Master Mehmood Ali (Ret. P/S Teacher), Muhammad Tanseer Ali.

See also
 List of railway stations in Pakistan
 Pakistan Railways

References

External links

Railway stations in Sheikhupura District
Railway stations on Shahdara Bagh–Chak Amru Branch Line